Springville station is a historic train station located at Springville, Erie County, New York. It was built in 1910 by the Buffalo, Rochester and Pittsburgh Railway, and is a 1 1/2-story, rectangular brick building with a hipped roof.  It consists of a central two-story tower section flanked by wings. 

The Baltimore and Ohio Railroad operated both daytime and nighttime trains through the station on the BR&P route between Lackawanna Terminal in Buffalo and Baltimore and Ohio Station in Pittsburgh. Additionally, the company operated a local Buffalo to DuBois, Pennsylvania train through the station. The B&O last had passenger trains using the station in 1955 in daytime runs between Pittsburgh and Buffalo.

The building was listed on the National Register of Historic Places in 1991 as the Buffalo, Rochester and Pittsburgh Railroad Station.

References

Railway stations on the National Register of Historic Places in New York (state)
Railway stations in the United States opened in 1910
Springville BRandP
Former Baltimore and Ohio Railroad stations
National Register of Historic Places in Erie County, New York
1910 establishments in New York (state)